16S rRNA (guanine966-N2)-methyltransferase (yhhF (gene), rsmD (gene), m2G966 methyltransferase) is an enzyme with systematic name S-adenosyl-L-methionine:16S rRNA (guanine966-N2)-methyltransferase. This enzyme catalyses the following chemical reaction

 S-adenosyl-L-methionine + guanine966 in 16S rRNA  S-adenosyl-L-homocysteine + N2-methylguanine966 in 16S rRNA

The enzyme efficiently methylates guanine966 of the assembled 30S subunits in vitro.

References

External links 
 

EC 2.1.1